Dan Danglo (March 1, 1925 – June 6, 2020) was an American cartoonist and animator who worked for Terrytoons, Warner Bros. Animation and Hanna-Barbera.

References

External links

1925 births
2020 deaths
People from Brooklyn
American cartoonists
American animators
American comics artists
Warner Bros. Discovery people
Warner Bros. people
Terrytoons people
Hanna-Barbera people
Warner Bros. Animation people